Legislative elections were held in New Caledonia on 6 October 1957. The result was a victory for the Caledonian Union, which won 18 of the 30 seats.

Electoral system
Prior to the elections the 25-seat General Council was replaced by a 30-seat Territorial Assembly. The new body was elected by open list proportional representation.

The elections were held under universal suffrage, with around 33,600 registered voters, of which 18,964 were Kanaks and 13,406 Europeans.

Campaign
A total of 123 candidates contested the 30 seats, representing eight parties. The campaign started on 16 September, and was reported by Pacific Islands Monthly to have been "mild, with hardly an unkind word exchanged".

Results
Of the 30 elected members, 17 were Europeans and 13 Kanaks.

Elected members

Aftermath
An eight-member cabinet was elected by the Territorial Assembly in late October. All eight ministers were from the Caledonian Union.

References

New Caledonia
1957 in New Caledonia
Elections in New Caledonia
Election and referendum articles with incomplete results